The list of presidents of the Paleontological Society is a list of all the past and present presidents of the Paleontological Society.

1909 John Mason Clarke
1910 Charles Schuchert
1911 William Berryman Scott
1912 David White
1913 Charles D. Walcott
1914 Henry Fairfield Osborn
1915 Edward Oscar Ulrich
1916 Rudolf Ruedemann
1917 John Campbell Merriam
1918 Frank Hall Knowlton
1919 Robert Tracy Jackson
1920 Frederic Brewster Loomis
1921 Timothy W. Stanton
1922 William Diller Matthew
1923 T. Wayland Vaughan
1924 Edward Wilber Berry 
1925 Richard Swann Lull
1926 Stuart Weller
1927 William Arthur Parks
1928 August F. Foerste
1929 Ermine Cowles Case
1930 William H. Twenhofel
1931 Edgar Roscoe Cumings 
1932 Ray S. Bassler
1933 Edward Martin Kindle 
1934 Percy Edward Raymond
1935 Charles Kephart Swartz
1936 Gilbert Dennison Harris
1937 Joseph Augustine Cushman
1938 Charles W. Gilmore
1939 Ralph W. Chaney
1940 Carl O. Dunbar
1941 Lloyd William Stephenson
1942 Elias Howard Sellards
1943 John B. Reeside, Jr. 
1944 Benjamin Franklin Howell 
1945 Chester Stock
1946 James Brookes Knight
1947 Raymond C. Moore
1948 Wendell P. Woodring
1949 Winifred Goldring
1950 Charles Edwin Weaver
1951 Harold Ernest Vokes
1952 Julia A. Gardner
1953 William Storrs Cole
1954 Harry Stephen Ladd
1955 Alfred Scott Warthin Jr.
1957 G. Arthur Cooper
1958 Arthur K. Miller 
1959 Frank M. Swartz
1960 Kenneth Edward Caster
1961 Norman D. Newell
1962 John W. Wells 
1963 S. W. Muller
1964 Ralph Willard Imlay
1965 Harry B. Whittington
1966 John Wyatt Durham
1967 Erwin Charles Stumm 
1968 Alan Bosworth Shaw
1969 Digby J. McLaren
1970 William H. Easton 
1971 Bernhard Kummel
1972 Curt Teichert
1973 Porter M. Kier
1974 James W. Valentine
1975 William A. Oliver, Jr.
1976 Ellis L. Yochelson
1977 David M. Raup
1978 Frank G. Stehli
1979 Richard E. Grant
1980 Warren O. Addicott
1981 Arthur J. Boucot
1982 Erle G. Kauffman
1983 A. R. (Pete) Palmer
1984 Walter C. Sweet
1985 Helen Tappan Loeblich
1986 Norman F. Sohl
1987 Stephen J. Gould
1988 N. Gary Lane 
1989 Brian F. Glenister
1990 John Pojeta, Jr.
1991 Thomas E. Bolton
1992 Roger L. Kaesler
1993 Rodney M. Feldmann
1994 Steven M. Stanley
1995 Craig Call Black
1996 J. John Sepkoski, Jr.
1997 Jere H. Lipps
1998 Karl W. Flessa
1999 Peter H. Crane
2001 Patricia H. Kelley
2003 William I. Ausich
2005 David Bottjer
2007 Derek E. G. Briggs
2009 Douglas H. Erwin
2011 Philip D. Gingerich
2013 Sandra J. Carlson
2015 Steven M. Holland
2017 Arnold I. Miller
2019 Bruce J. MacFadden
2021 William DiMichele
2023 Anne Raymond (President-Elect)

Gallery

References

Presidents of the Paleontogical Society, List of
Paleontological Society
Paleontological Society
Paleontological Society